Below is a list of all the teams that ever have ever played, or will play, in the Men's Premier Soccer League (MPSL) or National Premier Soccer League (NPSL).

(Current as of 2021 season)

References

National Premier Soccer League teams